This article describes the group stage of the 2014–15 Women's EHF Champions League.

Format
The 16 teams were drawn into four groups of four teams, where they played each other twice. The top three teams advanced to the main round. The draw took place on 27 June 2014, at 18:00 local time, in Vienna, Austria.

Seedings
The seedings were published on 23 June 2014.

Group A

Group B

Group C

Group D

References

External links
Official website

2014–15 Women's EHF Champions League